Oum El Bouaghi or Oum el-Bouaghi is a province (wilaya) of Algeria in the Aures region. The capital is Oum el-Bouaghi, which was named Can Robert (during French occupation), Sidi R'Ghis a few years later, and Oum El Bouaghi before independence.

History
The province was created from Constantine (department) in 1974.

In 1984 Khenchela Province and Mila Province were carved out of its territory.

Administrative divisions
The province is divided into 12 districts (daïras), which are further divided into 29 communes or municipalities.

Districts

 Aïn Babouche
 Aïn Beïda
 Aïn Fakroun
 Aïn Kechra
 Aïn M'Lila
 Dhalaâ
 F'Kirina
 Ksar Sbahi
 Meskiana
 Oum El Bouaghi
 Sigus
 Souk Naâmane

Communes

 Aïn Babouche
 Aïn Beïda
 Aïn Diss
 Aïn Fakroun
 Aïn Kercha
 Aïn M'lila
 Aïn Zitoun
 Behir Chergui
 Berriche
 Bir Chouhada
 D'hala (Dhalaâ)
 El Amiria
 El Belala
 El Djazia
 El Fedjouz Boughrara Saoudi
 El Harmilia
 Fkirina (F'Kirina)
 Hanchir Toumghani
 Ksar Sbahi
 Meskiana
 Oued Nini
 Ouled Gacem
 Ouled Hamla
 Ouled Zouaï
 Oum El Bouaghi
 Rahia
 Sigus
 Souk Naâmane
 Zorg

References

 
Provinces of Algeria
States and territories established in 1974